Boris Grinsson (1907 in Pskov, Russia – 1999) was an artist famous for drawing the designs for over 2000 French film posters.

Fleeing Russia after the Bolshevik take over, Grinsson's family settled in Estonia with Boris studying art in Tartu. Moving to Berlin to use his skills, he found work at the UFA Studio designing film posters. His drawing of an anti-Hitler election poster in 1932 led him to flee Germany to Paris after Hitler took power.

References
 Segura, Jean Boris Grinsson: Edition bilingue français-anglais Publisher Intemporel (Stanislas Choko), 2006

Notes

1907 births
1999 deaths
20th-century French painters
20th-century French male artists
French male painters
Film poster artists
French poster artists
Estonian emigrants to Germany
German emigrants to France